Mohammad-Qoli Khan or Mohammad-Qoli Khan b. Laleh Beg (fl. 17th-century), was a Safavid official who served as the governor (beglarbeg) of the  Erivan Province (also known as Chokhur-e Sa'd) in 1654–1656, succeeding the Circassian Kaykhosrow Khan Cherkes to this post. According to the modern historian Rudi Matthee, during the "scheming" of incumbent grand vizier Mohammad Beg (1654–1666), by which the latter managed to get rid of his adversaries, Mohammad-Qoli Khan was probably also one of those officials who lost their job.

References

Sources
  
 

17th-century deaths
Safavid governors of Erivan
17th-century people of Safavid Iran